Kittahutty Creek is a stream in the U.S. state of Mississippi. It is a tributary to the Skuna River.

Kittahutty is a name derived from either the Choctaw language or Chickasaw language.

References

Rivers of Mississippi
Rivers of Calhoun County, Mississippi
Rivers of Pontotoc County, Mississippi
Mississippi placenames of Native American origin